This is a list of radio stations located in the state of Coahuila, in Amplitude Modulation and Frequency Modulation.

Allende, Coah. 

Frequency Modulation

Barroteran, Coah. 

Frequency Modulation

Candela, Coah. 

Frequency Modulation

Castaños, Coah. 

Frequency Modulation

Ciudad Acuña, Coah. 

Frequency Modulation

Melchor Múzquiz, Coah. 

Frequency Modulation

Monclova, Coah. 

Amplitude Modulation

Frequency Modulation

Ocampo, Coah. 

Frequency Modulation

Parras de la Fuente, Coah. 

Frequency Modulation

Piedras Negras, Coah. 

Frequency Modulation

Sabinas, Coah. 

Frequency Modulation

San Pedro de las Colonias, Coah. 

Frequency Modulation

Saltillo, Coah. 

Amplitude Modulation

Frequency Modulation

Sierra Mojada, Coah. 

Frequency Modulation

Torreón, Coahuila 

Amplitude Modulation

Frequency Modulation

Zaragoza, Coahuila 

Frequency Modulation

Closing stations 
All the AM stations that appear here requested their frequency change to broadcast on FM.

Allende, Coah. 

Amplitude Modulation

Ciudad Acuña, Coah. 

Amplitude Modulation

Melchor Muzquiz, Coah. 

Amplitude Modulation

Monclova, Coah. 

Amplitude Modulation

Piedras Negras, Coah. 

Amplitude Modulation

Sabinas, Coah. 

Amplitude Modulation

Saltillo, Coah. 

Amplitude Modulation

Defunct formats

Ciudad Acuña, Coah. 

Frequency Modulation

Monclova, Coah. 

Frequency Modulation

Combo

Piedras Negras Coah. 

Frequency Modulation

Sabinas, Coah. 

Frequency Modulation

Saltillo, Coah. 

Frequency Modulation

Frequency changes

Ciudad Acuña, Coah. 

Amplitude Modulation

Saltillo, Coah. 

Amplitude Modulation

Notes 

 All the AM radio stations in Coahuila that acquired an FM frequency means that they are going to change their frequency, except the XEWGR-AM station in Monclova and the XERCA-AM station in Torreón, because their frequency of each in FM it is additional.

References 

Coahuila
Coahuila